The Dividing Line may refer to:

 The Dividing Line (Youth Brigade album)
 The Dividing Line (SSS album)
 Alternative title for the 1950 American film The Lawless
 "The Dividing Line" (song), by Genesis on the 1997 album Calling All Stations